Greatest Hits is the second greatest hits album by American singer-songwriter Mariah Carey, released in the United States on December 4, 2001, by Columbia Records. It is a greatest hits double album: CD 1 is primarily a collection of Carey's hits from 1990 to 1995, while CD 2 is primarily a collection of hits from 1995 to 2000. In 2011, the album was re-issued outside the US with the same track listing, titled The Essential Mariah Carey.

Content 
Carey had previously released the compilation album #1's (1998), but the release of her Greatest Hits album was a contractual agreement beyond her control, since she had left Columbia Records and had moved on to Virgin Records. The idea of a greatest hits album was part of a four-album agreement between Columbia Records and Carey to terminate her contract with them. The album had little creative input from Carey and there are no personal messages within its liner notes, unlike #1's.

All tracks from the previous album, with the exception of "Whenever You Call" with Brian McKnight, and the #1's international bonus track "Theme from Mahogany (Do You Know Where You're Going To)" are included on Greatest Hits. Tracks that were not included on #1's are:
the U.S. top five hits "Can't Let Go" (#2, 1991), "Make It Happen" (#5, 1992) and "Without You" (#3, 1994), and the top twenty hit "Anytime You Need a Friend" (#12, 1994);
the radio airplay-only tracks "Forever" (1996), "Underneath the Stars" (1996), and "Butterfly" (1997);
"Endless Love" (#2, 1994), a top five duet with Luther Vandross, which had not been previously included on any Carey album;
"Heartbreaker" (1999) and "Thank God I Found You" (2000), the two singles from Carey's Rainbow album that went to number 1 following the release of #1's, as well as "Can't Take That Away (Mariah's Theme)" (2000), another single from Rainbow;
the So So Def remix of "All I Want for Christmas Is You" (2000) featuring Bow Wow and Jermaine Dupri, which had only been included on the Japanese re-release of the single in 2000.

Not included in Greatest Hits was the 1994 single "Never Forget You", which was released as a double-A-sided single along with "Without You" and charted as such in the US.

International versions of Greatest Hits additionally include "Against All Odds" (2000), a duet with Westlife. The Japanese version contains "Against All Odds", "Open Arms" (1996), the non-single album track "Music Box" from the album Music Box (1993), and the Merry Christmas album version of "All I Want for Christmas Is You"; it is also the only album to include the "Never Too Far/Hero Medley" (2001) single.

Reception 

Upon release, the compilation album received positive reviews. Sal Cinquemani, writer for Slant, gave the album 3.5 out of 5 stars. Cinquemani stated that with this album, Carey's ex-husband and company attempt to "cash in Carey's pre-borderline Columbia Years". He also agreed that "Carey's greatest hits have often fallen short of the Billboard perch". He gave high praise to " Make It Happen", Carey's cover of Harry Nilsson's "Without You" and "Underneath the Stars" stating that they "have certainly earned their spots" next to hits like "Hero" and "One Sweet Day". Devon Powers of PopMatters also praised the album calling Carey a "pop princess, hammering out fast numbers with a zeal and determination" highlight that the album moves "chronologically through [her] remarkable career".

Commercial  performance 
As of November 2018, Greatest Hits has sold 1,230,000 copies in the US. Globally, the album has sold an estimated five million copies.

Track listing

Charts

Weekly charts

Year-end charts

All-time charts

Certifications and sales

References 

Mariah Carey compilation albums
2001 greatest hits albums
Albums produced by Ric Wake
Albums produced by Walter Afanasieff
Albums produced by Jermaine Dupri
Columbia Records compilation albums